Tetracha speciosa is a species of tiger beetle that was described by Chaudoir in 1860, and is endemic to Brazil.

References

Beetles described in 1860
Endemic fauna of Brazil
Beetles of South America
Cicindelidae